Darekia is a genus of stem group Neoptera which existed in what is now Poland, during the upper Carboniferous period. It was described by Jakub Prokop, Wieslaw Krzemiński, Ewa Krzemińska, and Dariusz Wojciechowski in 2012, and the type species is Darekia sanguinea.

References

Pennsylvanian insects
Gzhelian life
Kasimovian life
Carboniferous animals of Europe
Fossils of Poland
Fossil taxa described in 2012
Prehistoric insect genera